The Ralston Building, now known as the Carrion Jewelry Center, is a historic building located in Downtown Miami. At the time of its completion in 1917, the eight story building was the tallest building in Miami, a title it held for less than one year when it was surpassed by the McAllister Hotel, built later in 1917. In 2001, it was purchased by First & First Investments, a company owned by local jeweler Juan Perez-Carrion. He purchased the building as the headquarters for Carrion Jewelry Manufacturing. Over the course of 3 years he restored the dilapidated building to its former grandeur. The building is located at 40 Northeast 1st Avenue and is now used for office space.

See also
List of tallest buildings in Miami#Timeline of tallest buildings

References

Buildings and structures in Miami
National Register of Historic Places in Miami
Historic district contributing properties in Florida
1917 establishments in Florida
Commercial buildings on the National Register of Historic Places in Florida